Europa is a 2021 joint Iraqi-Kuwaiti drama film directed by Haider Rashid. It was selected as the Iraqi entry for the Best International Feature Film at the 94th Academy Awards.

Cast
 Adam Ali as Kamal
 Erfan Rashid as Erfan
 Gassid Mohammed as Gassid
 Svetlana Yancheva as Woman
 Mohamed Zouaoui as Trafficker

See also
 List of submissions to the 94th Academy Awards for Best International Feature Film
 List of Iraqi submissions for the Academy Award for Best International Feature Film

References

External links
 

2021 films
2021 drama films
Iraqi drama films
Kuwaiti drama films
2020s Arabic-language films